Kaare Vedvik (born March 16, 1994) is a Norwegian professional gridiron football placekicker and punter for the Saskatchewan Roughriders of the Canadian Football League (CFL). He played college football at Marshall and signed with the Baltimore Ravens as an undrafted free agent in 2018. He has also been a member of several other National Football League (NFL) teams.

Early life
Vedvik was born and raised in Norway to a Nigerian immigrant father and Norwegian mother and he first came in contact with American football when he joined the Stavanger based team AFC Show in 2011. He later spent his junior year playing for McPherson High School in McPherson, Kansas, as an exchange student in the United States. He initially wanted to play wide receiver, but his coaches at McPherson discovered he was better suited to play kicker.

College career
Vedvik joined Marshall in 2013. After using a redshirt season in 2013, Vedvik served as Marshall's kickoff specialist in 2014. Vedvik did not play in 2015, serving as backup punter. Vedvik became Marshall's punter in 2016, and was named Conference USA Special Teams Player of the Week on November 1, 2016. Vedvik was Marshall's punter and placekicker in 2017. On October 14, 2017, Vedvik kicked a 92-yard punt, the 7th longest in FBS history and the longest since Ray Guy's 93-yard punt in 1972. He was named 2017 C-USA All-Conference First-team as a punter.

Professional career

Baltimore Ravens
Vedvik was signed as an undrafted free agent by the Baltimore Ravens in 2018. Vedvik was placed on the reserve/non-football injury list after he was assaulted before the start of the season.
In the Ravens' 2019 preseason opener on August 8, 2019, he made all four of his field goals, including a 55-yard try.

Minnesota Vikings
On August 11, 2019, Vedvik was traded to the Minnesota Vikings for a fifth-round pick in the 2020 NFL Draft. He was waived on August 31, 2019 after losing the kicker job to veteran Dan Bailey.

New York Jets
On September 1, 2019, Vedvik was claimed off waivers by the New York Jets. In the opening game of the season against the Buffalo Bills, Vedvik missed an extra point attempt and a 45-yard field goal; the Jets lost the game 17–16. He was waived on September 10, 2019.

Cincinnati Bengals
On December 16, 2019, Vedvik was signed to the Cincinnati Bengals practice squad. His practice squad contract with the team expired on January 6, 2020.

Buffalo Bills
On January 7, 2020, Vedvik signed a reserve/futures contract with the Buffalo Bills. He was waived on August 19, 2020.

Carolina Panthers
Vedvik was claimed off waivers by the Carolina Panthers on August 20, 2020. He was waived on September 5, 2020 and signed to the practice squad the next day before being waived again on September 15, 2020.

Washington Football Team
Vedvik signed with the practice squad of the Washington Football Team on October 9, 2020. On January 11, 2021, Vedvik signed a reserve/futures contract with Washington, but was waived with a non-football injury designation on January 28, 2021.

On April 15, 2021, Vedvik was drafted by the Saskatchewan Roughriders in the second round of the 2021 CFL Global Draft.

Jacksonville Jaguars
Vedvik was signed to the practice squad of the Jacksonville Jaguars on September 3, 2021. He was released on September 8, 2021.

Saskatchewan Roughriders
On October 10, 2021, it was announced that Vedvik had signed with the Saskatchewan Roughriders.

References

External links

 Marshall Thundering Herd bio

1994 births
Living people
American football placekickers
American football punters
Canadian football punters
Baltimore Ravens players
Buffalo Bills players
Carolina Panthers players
Cincinnati Bengals players
Jacksonville Jaguars players
Marshall Thundering Herd football players
Minnesota Vikings players
New York Jets players
Norwegian expatriate sportspeople in the United States
Norwegian people of Nigerian descent
Norwegian players of American football
Saskatchewan Roughriders players
Sportspeople from Stavanger
Washington Football Team players